The Estoril Challenge de Portugal was a golf tournament on the Challenge Tour that was held near Estoril, on the Portuguese Riviera. It was first played in 1997. Then it took a 6-year hiatus until it was played again in 2004. It was not played in 2005 and then it returned in 2006 and 2007.

Winners

External links
Official coverage on the Challenge Tour's official site

Former Challenge Tour events
Golf tournaments in Portugal